Garth may refer to:

Places

Canada
Garth, Alberta

United Kingdom
Garth, Bridgend, a village in south Wales
 Garth railway station (Bridgend)
Garth, Ceredigion, small village in Wales
Garth, Powys, a village in mid Wales
 Garth railway station (Powys)
Garth Hill, The Garth, Garth Hill or Garth Mountain, a mountain near Cardiff, Wales
Garth, one of many other minor place names in the United Kingdom

Buildings and structures

United Kingdom
Garth (Guilsfield), a historic house in Guilsfield, Montgomeryshire, UK
Castle Garth, a medieval fortification in Newcastle upon Tyne, England
Garth Pier, a Grade II listed structure in Bangor, Gwynedd, North Wales
Garth Castle, home to Clan Stewart of Atholl, north-west of Aberfeldy, Scotland

Arts and entertainment
Garth (comic strip), published in the British newspaper Daily Mirror from 1943 to 1997
Planet Garth, setting of David Brin's novel The Uplift War

People and fictional characters
Garth (name), a list of people and fictional characters with the given name, nickname or surname
Garth (comics), fictional DC Comics superhero
Sir Charles Lloyd, 1st Baronet, of Garth (died c. 1678), Welsh merchant and politician
Sir John Edwards, 1st Baronet, of Garth (1770–1850), British Member of Parliament

Other uses
, a Royal Navy destroyer
Garth (architecture), a cloister garden of a medieval monastery
Garth Stadium, a former greyhound racing track in Taff's Well, near Cardiff, Wales
HM Prison Garth, a prison in Lancashire
Garth School, Georgetown, Kentucky, United States
Garth Street (Hamilton, Ontario), an arterial road in Hamilton, Ontario, Canada

See also
John MacDonald of Garth (1771–1866), Canadian fur trader
Garth-eryr, Site of Special Scientific Interest near Llangedwyn in Powys, Wales
Gwaelod-y-Garth, a village in the parish of Pentyrch, Cardiff, Wales
Rhos-y-garth, hamlet in Ceredigion, Wales